Christopher James Cox (born 14 May 1962) is a former Zimbabwean international cricketer who played several games for Zimbabwe in 1986. He played as a left-arm orthodox bowler.

Born in Umtali (present-day Mutare), Cox debuted for Zimbabwe B during the 1980–81 season, appearing twice in three-day fixtures against Kenya. He made his senior debut for Zimbabwe in April 1986, playing one-day and first-class fixtures against New South Wales (a touring Australian state team). The following month, Cox was named in Zimbabwe's squad for the 1986 ICC Trophy in England. He played only a single match at the tournament, against East Africa, but did feature in a one-day tour game against Northamptonshire. Cox's final appearance for Zimbabwe came in October 1986, against a touring West Indies B side. He remained in competition for national selection for at least another season, however, playing first-class matches for Zimbabwe B in March 1987 and March 1988 (against Pakistan B and Sri Lanka B, respectively).

References

External links
Player profile and statistics at Cricket Archive
Player profile and statistics at ESPNcricinfo

1962 births
Living people
Cricketers from Mutare
Zimbabwean cricketers